HMS Porpoise was a 12-gun sloop-of-war originally built in Bilbao, Spain, as the packet ship Infanta Amelia. On 6 August 1799 HMS Argo captured her off the coast of Portugal. Porpoise wrecked in 1803 on the North coast of what was then part of the Colony of New South Wales, now called Wreck Reefs, off the coast of Queensland, Australia.

Service
Porpoise was commissioned in October 1799 under Lieutenant William Scott as a storeship for New South Wales. She sailed in April and arrived on 7 November 1800 in Port Jackson.

George Suttor was engaged as gardener to prepare the plants and care for them on the voyage. In return he received free passage for himself and his family.

Governor Philip Gidley King appointed himself Captain of Porpoise on 6 November 1800, but left actual command in Scott's hands. Scott took her to Norfolk Island on at least two voyages and to Otaheite to bring back salt pork in exchange for arms, among other goods. King had an agreement with King Pōmare I under which Pōmare sought to monopolize the trade in salt pork.

Bad weather forced both vessels to return to Sydney.

Wreck and loss

On 10 August 1803, Porpoise left Sydney under the command of Lieutenant Robert Fowler and in the company of Cato, under Captain John Park, and the East Indiaman , under Captain Palmer, bound for India.  On 17 August the three ships got caught near a sandbank, 157 north and 51 miles east of Sandy Cape.

With shrinking leeway, both the Cato and Porpoise grounded. Both ships beat on the sharp coral, with the result that they sank quickly. Bridgewater sailed on and later reported both ships lost with no survivors. The crew and passengers of Cato and Porpoise were able to land on a sandbank as both ships broke up.

Matthew Flinders, who was returning to England as a passenger on Porpoise, together with his charts and logbooks, believed that Captain Palmer sailed on despite knowing that the other two ships had come to grief. Another passenger was the artist William Westall, many of whose works were damaged in the wrecking.

On 26 August 1803, with no sign of rescue, Flinders and Park took the largest cutter, which they named Hope. Together with twelve crewmen they headed to Sydney to seek rescue.

Through marvelous navigation, Hope made the 800 mile voyage to Port Jackson by 8 September.

Francis returned to Sydney with some of the men. Cumberland, with Flinders, went to the Torres Straits and on to Île de France, where the French governor imprisoned him for five years and seven months. Lieutenants Fowler, Flinders (Matthew Flinders' brother), and John Franklin sailed with Rolla to China. They then took passage on the East Indiaman  under Commodore Nathaniel Dance. They therefore participated in the Battle of Pulo Aura. Fowler took command of the upper deck, where he distinguished himself, and Franklin was in charge of the signals.

Wreck site
In 1965 Ben Cropp found the wreck sites of the Cato and Porpoise at Wreck Reefs after extensive research and only fifteen minutes of actual diving. The site is now a protected area with the designation dating to 29 April 1992.

Citations and references
Citations

References

External links
, 

1799 ships
Ships built in Spain
1799 in Spain
Maritime exploration of Australia
Shipwrecks in the Coral Sea
Shipwrecks of Queensland
History of New South Wales
Maritime incidents in 1803
Captured ships
Australian Shipwrecks with protected zone